The 1997–98 season was Cardiff City F.C.'s 71st season in the Football League. They competed in the 24-team Division Three, then the fourth tier of English football, finishing twenty-first.

The season also saw the launch of the FAW Premier Cup with Cardiff reaching the final before losing 2–1 to Wrexham.

Players

   

  

First team squad.

League table

Results by round

Fixtures and results

Third Division

Source

Coca-Cola Cup (League Cup)

FA Cup

Auto Windscreens Shield

FAW Premier Cup

See also 

List of Cardiff City F.C. seasons

References

Bibliography
 

 
 Welsh Football Data Archive

1997-98
Welsh football clubs 1997–98 season
1997–98 Football League Third Division by team